Chumakov is a rural locality (a khutor) in Krasnogvardeyskoye Rural Settlement of Koshekhablsky District, Adygea, Russia. The population was 78 as of 2018. There is 1 street.

Geography 
The khutor is located on the right bank of the Belaya River, 14 km southwest of Krasnogvardeyskoye (the district's administrative centre) by road. Adamy is the nearest rural locality.

References 

Rural localities in Koshekhablsky District